Reginald Bernie Lewis (January 23, 1936 – February 11, 2021) was an American bodybuilder and actor. 

Lewis was born in Niles, California, in January 1936. He appeared as contestant with his wife, June, on a November 1959 episode of the television gameshow You Bet Your Life, with Groucho Marx. In the 1970s, Lewis appeared in a number of films including Mae West's Sextette in 1978.

He died in February 2021, at the age of 85.

References

External links
 

1936 births
2021 deaths
20th-century American male actors
American bodybuilders
American male film actors
People associated with physical culture
People from Fremont, California